Shin Ae-ra (born March 7, 1969) is a South Korean actress. She made her acting debut in 1989, and has since played leading roles in television dramas such as Love in Your Arms and Bad Housewife. She married actor Cha In-pyo in 1995, and the couple gained widespread approval and respect from the Korean public for being philanthropists. They are active volunteers at orphanages and welfare centers, as well as generous donors to causes such as the fight against child abuse and school violence, rights for North Korean refugees, and humanitarian aid to underprivileged children (particularly in North Korea and Uganda), often working with the organizations Compassion International and the Social Welfare Society.

Shin gave birth to a son, Cha Jeong-min in 1998, but she and her husband made headlines when they adopted baby girls, Cha Ye-eun in 2005, and Cha Ye-jin in 2008. Their case highlighted the issue of adoption in Korea, where despite the prevalence of overseas adoption, domestic adoption is rare and stigmatized due to culturally held beliefs stressing "pure" blood lines. Shin and Cha's case was even more notable since Korean couples with biological children of their own rarely adopt, and they were lauded for serving as positive role models.

Filmography

Television series

Film

Variety show

Theater

Radio program

Awards and nominations

References

External links 
  
 
 
 

1969 births
Living people
South Korean radio presenters
South Korean television actresses
South Korean film actresses
South Korean stage actresses
South Korean musical theatre actresses
Yeongsan Shin clan
South Korean women radio presenters